Caroline Farberger (born 1967)  is a Swedish business executive currently working as partner and chairwoman of the venture capital company Wellstreet.  She previously served as the CEO of the Swedish company , part of the ICA Group, from 2016 to 2022. Formerly having lived as a man, Farberger is known for being the first Swedish top CEO coming out as transgender. She came out at the age of 49.

Farberger grew up in Uddevalla and Lerum. She completed military service as a company commander at the Älvsborg Regiment (I15). After completing degrees in business administration at Gothenburg School of Business, Economics and Law and electrical engineering at Chalmers University of Technology, Farberger worked as a management consultant with McKinsey for six years. During the dot-com bubble she founded InsMark, a finance company, before moving on to work in the insurance industry. A year later she began the process of seeking gender-affirming care, eventually coming out as trans in 2018. In 2019 she won "LGBTQ person of the year" at Gaygalan Awards. In 2020, her autobiography  was published. The book was nominated for Book of the Year by QX magazine. After quitting her job as CEO at ICA insurance in 2022 she moved on to become a partner and the president of risk capital firm Wellstreet.

Personal life 
Farberger has three children.

References 

1967 births
Living people
Swedish business executives
20th-century Swedish women
21st-century Swedish women
21st-century Swedish businesspeople